KTCK-FM (96.7 MHz, "The Ticket") is a commercial radio station licensed to Flower Mound, Texas, and serving the Dallas/Fort Worth Metroplex.  It simulcasts a sports radio format, along with sister station KTCK 1310 AM.  KTCK-AM-FM are owned by Cumulus Media with studios on East Lamar Boulevard in Arlington.  Weekdays feature local Dallas-based sports shows, while Fox Sports Radio is heard late nights and weekends.  KTCK-AM-FM are the flagship stations for the Dallas Stars Radio Network.

KTCK-FM has an effective radiated power (ERP) of 90,000 watts.  The transmitter is on Farm to Market Road in Rosston, Texas, about 35 miles northwest of Dallas.  The signal extends into Oklahoma but may be hard to hear in some southern suburbs of Dallas and Fort Worth.

History

KDSQ/KSHN/Kick'm Country

In , the station signed on as KDSQ.  It was based in the Sherman-Denison area on 101.7 FM.  Two years later, it changed its call sign to KSHN.  And in 1975 it changed to KIKM-FM with a country music format during the day and Top 40 at night (simulcast from sister station KIKM), then to full-time Top 40 a couple years later. In 1983, the call sign changed to KZXL-FM, but two years later the previous call sign was re-established with a 24-hour country music format known as "Kick'm Country".

A decade later, KIKM-FM swapped frequencies with KDVE (also in Sherman), however the station went dark in 1997. During that time, the city of license was changed from Sherman to its current location in Flower Mound, Texas.

Memories 96.7 FM

A couple months later, the KNKI call letters were established, but the station did not sign on until November 1998, under the control of Disney/ABC Radio. After launching on November 23, 1998, as Memories 96.7 FM, playing soft oldies from the 1950s to the 1970s, it changed call signs to KMEO on December 28, 1998. 

During overnight hours, KMEO switched to live "Memories"/"Unforgettable Favorites" programming from ABC Music Radio. Previously live, local programming was briefly replaced by ABC Radio's corporate "Memories" satellite programming for a full 24 hours on June 26, 2003, until 5pm on June 27, 2003 when the "Memories" format was dropped.

96.7 The Texas Twister
96.7 The Twister (alternately "The Texas Twister") officially "touched down" at 5 pm on June 27, 2003. The last song heard on "Memories" was "Thanks For The Memory" by Bob Hope. This was followed by the first song on the "Twister", being "It's Five O'Clock Somewhere" by Alan Jackson. This was the start of 20,000 songs in a row without commercial interruption. Initially jockless, The Twister started adding DJs in September 2003. Its playlist was composed of "today's modern country hits" mixed with Texas country music, thus adopting the slogan "The Most New Country In Texas". The call letters were not officially changed to KTYS until October 21, 2003. On June 12, 2007, 24 Disney/ABC Radio stations, including KTYS, merged into Citadel Broadcasting's portfolio. The KMEO call letters have been reassigned to an American Family Radio-affiliate station in Mertzon, Texas.

Platinum 96.7

On June 30, 2008, at 5:28 a.m., after five years as The Twister, the station ended its tenure as a country station in favor of returning to Oldies as Platinum 96.7. The last song on "The Twister" was "Kiss My Country Ass" by Rhett Akins, while the first song on "Platinum" being "Hello, Goodbye" by The Beatles. From there, it broadcast a diverse oldies format, as the playlist was taken directly from the remnants of the former ABC Radio's corporate "Memories" music library; thus, their slogan was "Forgotten Hits Re-Discovered." It also marked a return of a few former "Memories" personalities with Ron Chapman as the station's consultant. The callsign was changed to KPMZ on July 2, 2008 (referring to a PlatinuM record and paying homage to "Memories 96.7"). The "Texas Twister" format was moved to its sister station KSCS's HD-2 signal.  KPMZ ceased transmitting its digital "HD Radio" signal in 2009.  Because the license to broadcast digital "HD Radio" is perpetual, the station could resume digital broadcasts at any time.

WBAP simulcast
At Noon CT on March 12, 2010, after playing "Na Na Hey Hey Kiss Him Goodbye" by Steam, the station briefly reverted to its previous "Texas Twister" country music format. Two hours later, a stunt known as "Reagan Radio" began, exclusively featuring sound clips from former president Ronald Reagan. The station began simulcasting sister station WBAP on Monday, March 15.  Although broadcasting on a rimshot frequency, the staff at WBAP claims that this station will provide "crystal-clear FM fidelity" for their listeners in 96.7's pre-determined coverage area. The station changed call signs to WBAP-FM effective March 19, 2010. Citadel merged with Cumulus Media on September 16, 2011. With the simulcast in place, the station was responsible for activation of the North Texas Emergency Alert System (alongside sister stations WBAP-AM and KSCS) when hazardous weather alerts, disaster area declarations, and AMBER Alerts are issued.

KTCK/The Ticket simulcast

On October 7, 2013, Cumulus announced that effective October 21, 96.7 would change from a simulcast of news/talk AM station WBAP to sports AM station KTCK. Dan Bennet, Dallas/Fort Worth market manager for Cumulus, said that WBAP had "no ratings increase since adding the FM." The WBAP simulcast moved to KPLX 99.5 HD2. A callsign change to KTCK-FM took effect October 27.

It is also likely, however, that the station's flip was also related to a botched sale of previous FM simulcast KTDK; the same day as the flip's announcement, the Federal Communications Commission had rejected a planned sale of the KTDK signal to Whitley Media to make room for a potential sale of rival station KESN by owner The Walt Disney Company; this was due to the structuring of the deal, attempting to find a legal loophole wherein Cumulus would still control KTDK through a local marketing agreement and could claim all financial support of the station and any sale or shutdown, and the FCC shut down such a loophole judging that such a move rendered Whitley Media merely a shell corporation for Cumulus, since they'd carry any financial success or failure the station had. Following the decision, Cumulus then decided to move KTCK's FM simulcast to 96.7 and turn in KTDK's licence for deletion by the FCC.

Former on-air staff
John LaBella: morning host 1998–2002 (deceased)
Chaz Mixon: 1999–2004 (most recently with KKHJ-FM in Pago Pago, American Samoa)
Becky Wight: DJ & "Memories Scrapbook" host 1998–2003
Randy Fuller: 1998–2003
Mike Young: 1998–2003
Bob Lawrence: 1998–2003
Susan Edwards: 1998–2003
Sammi Gonzales: 1998–2003
Tori Logan: 1998–2003
Pamela Steele: 1998–2003
Bob Eliot: 1998–2003
Tyler Cox: 1998-2003, 2008–2010
Vic Thomas: 1998-2003 (via satellite), 2008–2010
Blake Barret: nighttime host 2004–2005, now morning show host for Radio Disney nationwide.
Carletta Blake: nighttime host 2008
Scott Gaines: midday & nighttime host 2003–2006
Hondo: overnight host & weekends; host of Club Twister 2006–2008
Lorri Leigh: nighttime host 2006–2008, now part-time on New Country 96.3 KSCS
Angie Michaels: nighttime Host 2008-2009
Allan Peck: afternoon host 2003–2008, now morning show producer on The Big 96.3 KSCS
Crash Poteet: morning host 2004–2008
Jeremy Robinson: midday & nighttime host 2005–2008
Wendy Westbrook: afternoon host 2008-2009

Signal
Unlike most of the area's FM stations like sister stations KSCS, KPLX and KLIF-FM, which transmit their signals from Cedar Hill and Southwest Dallas, KTCK-FM transmits its signal from an unincorporated area within the county borders of Cooke, Montague, and Wise. Therefore, KTCK's FM signal is much stronger in the Northwestern parts of the Dallas/Fort Worth metroplex as well as the cities of Decatur, Bowie, Gainesville, and Sherman, to as far north as Ardmore, Oklahoma, but is considerably weaker in Dallas and areas southeast of the Metroplex.

References

External links

 DFW Radio/TV History

TCK-FM
Sports radio stations in the United States
Radio stations established in 1967
1967 establishments in Texas
Cumulus Media radio stations
Former subsidiaries of The Walt Disney Company
Fox Sports Radio stations